Three Great Guys is a joint album by Paul Anka, Sam Cooke and Neil Sedaka. It was released in February 1964 and included 12 songs with four songs from each of the three artists and a collaboration on the last Neil Sedaka track by Stan Applebaum and His Orchestra. René Hall and Sammy Lowe were the orchestra conductors on the other tracks.

Track list
Side A
"I Can't Say a Word"—Paul Anka
"No, No"—Paul Anka
"I'm Gonna Forget About You"—Sam Cooke
"Tenderness"—Sam Cooke
"This Endless Night"—Neil Sedaka (Arranged by conductor Stan Applebaum and produced by Al Nevins)
"Too Late"—Neil Sedaka (Produced by Al Nevins and Don Kirshner)

Side B
"Laugh Laugh Laugh"—Paul Anka
"I Remember"—Paul Anka
"I Ain't Gonna Cheat On You No More"—Sam Cooke
"Talkin' Trash"—Sam Cooke
"Without Your Love"—Neil Sedaka  (Produced by Al Nevins)
"Another Day, Another Heartache"—Neil Sedaka with Stan Applebaum and His Orchestra (Produced by Al Nevins and Don Kirshner)

References

1961 albums
Neil Sedaka albums
Paul Anka albums
Sam Cooke albums
Albums produced by Hugo & Luigi
RCA Records albums
Collaborative albums
Albums conducted by Sammy Lowe
Albums conducted by René Hall
Albums produced by Al Nevins
Albums produced by Don Kirshner